The 18504 / 03 Sainagar Shirdi–Visakhapatnam Express is an Express train belonging to Indian Railways South Coast Railway zone that run between  and  in India.

Service 
It operates as train number 18504 from Sainagar Shirdi to Visakhapatnam and as train number 18503 in the reverse direction serving the states of Maharashtra, Telangana & Andhra Pradesh.

Coaches

The 18504 / 03 Sainagar Shirdi–Visakhapatnam  Express has one AC 2-tier,  four AC 3-tier, eight sleeper class, six general unreserved & two SLR (seating with luggage rake) coaches. It does not carry a pantry car.

Routing & Stops
 Visakhapatnam
 Duvvada
 Anakapalle
 Elamanchili
 Tuni
 Samalkot
 Rajahmundry
 Eluru
 Tadepalligudem
 Vijayawada
 Khammam
 Warangal
 Kazipet
 Secunderabad
 Kamareddi
 Nizamabad
 Hazur Sahib Nanded
 Purna
 Parbhani
 Jalna
 Aurangabad
 Nagarsol
 Manmad
 Sainagar Shirdi

Rake sharing
This train shares its rake with Visakhapatnam–Chennai Central Express

Traction

References

External links
18504 Sainagar Shirdi Visakhapatnam Express at India Rail Info
18503 Visakhapatnam Sainagar Shirdi Express at India Rail Info

Express trains in India
Rail transport in Maharashtra
Rail transport in Karnataka
Rail transport in Telangana
Rail transport in Andhra Pradesh
Transport in Visakhapatnam
Transport in Shirdi